The Permas Jaya-Pasir Gudang Highway  or Johor Bahru East Coast Parkway, Federal Route 35, is a major highway in Johor Bahru, Johor, Malaysia. It is a toll free highway and part of the Iskandar Malaysia project. This 13.4 km (8.3 mile) highway connects Bakar Batu in city centre to the town of Pasir Gudang, and passes through Bandar Baru Permas Jaya and Taman Rinting. This highway also passes through Permas Jaya Bridge and is the alternative way to Pasir Gudang besides Pasir Gudang Highway. Johor Bahru East Coast Parkway is the fourth east–west-oriented expressway in the Iskandar Malaysia area after the Pasir Gudang Highway, the Pontian–Johor Bahru Link of the Second Link Expressway and the Senai–Desaru Expressway.

Route background
The Kilometre Zero of the Federal Route 35 starts at Kampung Bakar Batu Interchange.

In 2014, the Johor Bahru East Coast Parkway was gazetted as "Federal Route 35".

At most sections, the Federal Route 35 was built under the JKR R5 road standard, allowing maximum speed limit of up to 90 km/h.

There are no alternate routes, or sections with motorcycle lanes.

List of interchanges and towns

References

Malaysian Federal Roads
Expressways and highways in Johor